Gorgon, in comics, may refer to:

Gorgon (Inhuman), a Marvel Comics superhero
Gorgon (DC Comics), a DC supervillain
Gorgon (Tomi Shishido), a Marvel Comics supervillain
Gorgon, a DC Comics character and member of the Hybrids

See also
Gorgon (disambiguation)